Jeffrey Maddrey (born January 24, 1971) is an American police officer who is currently serving as the chief of department for the New York Police Department.

Maddrey has been sued by a subordinate in civil court on charges of harassment. Federal charges failed but he did face internal discipline. In 2021, Maddrey was criticized for ordering the release of a retired officer who had been arrested for menacing children with a gun.

References

Living people
1971 births
Place of birth missing (living people)
New York City Police Department officers